Jesús Daniel Bueno Áñez (born 15 April 1999) is a Venezuelan professional footballer who plays for the Philadelphia Union of Major League Soccer. He primarily plays as a defensive midfielder.

Club career

Deportivo Lara
Bueno played for Deportivo Lara as a youth before making his professional debut on October 23, 2016, as a starter in a 2–1 loss to Zamora. He scored his first goal on January 28, 2018, in a 3–2 win over Atletico Venezuela. Bueno has played in the Primera Division Championship Playoffs (2017, 2018 and 2020), and in his final playoff appearance with the club in 2020 he scored in the third minute of extra time for a 1–0 win over Caracas that secured his team third place overall. For the 2021 season, Bueno served as the captain of the team. On May 3, 2021, Bueno notched his first professional brace in a 4–1 win over Aragua FC. He made 81 Primera Division and 2 League Cup appearances for the Venezuelan side, scoring nine goals and logging three assists in that time.

He also made 6 appearances in the Copa Libertadores and 1 appearance in the Copa Sudamericana.

Philadelphia Union
On 29 July 2021, Bueno joined Major League Soccer club Philadelphia Union.

International career
Bueno participated in several Venezuela U20 training camps in 2018. He made his debut as a starter in a 1–0 loss to Chile on June 1, 2018.

In May 2021, Bueno was called into the national team's Copa America training camp. He had to leave camp shortly thereafter upon being diagnosed with COVID-19.

References

1999 births
Living people
Sportspeople from Barquisimeto
Venezuelan footballers
Association football midfielders
Philadelphia Union players
Venezuelan expatriate footballers
Expatriate soccer players in the United States
Major League Soccer players
Philadelphia Union II players
MLS Next Pro players